Leucas spiculifera is a species of flowering plant in the family Lamiaceae. It is found only in Yemen. Its natural habitat is rocky areas.

References

spiculifera
Endemic flora of Socotra
Least concern plants
Taxonomy articles created by Polbot